Federal Roads Maintenance Agency (FERMA) is the Federal Government of Nigeria agency concerned with road construction, improvement and connectivity between the States of Nigeria.

The agency is a subsidiary of the Federal Ministry of Work.

See also
Lagos Ibadan Expressway

References

Government agencies with year of establishment missing
Government agencies of Nigeria
Road transport in Nigeria
Road safety in Nigeria